Ladybirds' Christmas is a 2001 Estonian animated film directed by Janno Põldma and Heiki Ernits. The screenplay is written by Andrus Kivirähk, Janno Põldma and Heiki Ernits.

Cast
Lembit Ulfsak as Father Christmas and Goga (voice)
Anu Lamp as Mia (voice)
Andero Ermel as Tim (voice)
Kaljo Kiisk as	Imanuel (voice)
Peeter Oja	as Salvatore (voice)
Marko Matvere as Pedro (voice)
Jan Uuspõld as Jussi (voice)
Elina Reinold as Leonardo the Cricket (voice)
Margus Tabor as Flea-Dog and Father (voice)
Garmen Tabor as Mother (voice)
Johanna Ulfsak as Child (voice)

References

External links
 
 Lepatriinude jõulud, Estonian Film Database (EFIS)

2001 animated films
2001 films
Estonian animated films
Estonian-language films